Wiñoy Tripantu is the Mapuche celebration of the return of the sun and is sometimes called the Mapuche New Year. It takes place on the June solstice (the Winter solstice in the Southern Hemisphere), the shortest day of the year in the indigenous home of the Mapuche people. Frequently, We Tripantu (Mapudungun tr: new year) is used as a synonym for Wiñoy Tripantu, but some speakers of the Mapuche language Mapudungun use We Tripantu to refer to the New Year of the Gregorian calendar (January 1) and Wiñoy Tripantu for the celebration of the June solstice.

Many variations of the term Wiñoy Tripantu exist, such as Wiñol xipantu, Wvñol xipantu, Wiñol Txipantu and Wüñoy Tripantü.

It is the Mapuche equivalent to the Inti Raymi. The Pachamama (Quechua tr: Mother Earth), Nuke Mapu (uke' Mapu) begins to bloom fertilized by Sol, from the Andean heights to the southern tip. Antü (mapuche), Inti (Aymara), or Rapa (rapanui) Sol, the sun starts to come back to earth, after the longest night of the year; it's winter Solstice. Everything starts to bloom again.

Wiñoy Tripantu is celebrated with a ceremony on the shortest day of the year, during which various families or even various communities may come together to celebrate communally. All members of the community have a participatory role in the ceremony, which may involve songs, dances, a communal meal, and offerings to the land. Typically, a wood fire is lit, which traditionally is kept burning until sunrise the following day. Elders of the family or community tell stories with philosophical, cultural, and political undertones, as a method of transmitting Mapuche culture and history from one generation to the next. The ceremony ends with a communal breakfast.

Although Wiñoy Tripantu has been celebrated in Wallmapu (now southern Argentina and Chile) for centuries, it has seen a particular revival since the late twentieth century, associated with a broader revival of Mapuche cultural practices and land claims.

References 

Mapuche culture
Winter events in Argentina
Winter events in Chile
Winter holidays (Southern Hemisphere)